Ioannes IV (Iōannēs D΄) may refer to:

 Patriarch John IV of Constantinople (died in 595)
 John IV, Archbishop of Ohrid (c. 1088 – 1163/64)
 John IV Laskaris (1250–c. 1305)
 John IV Megas Komnenos (c. 1403–1459), emperor of Trebizond

See also
 John IV (disambiguation)